Rəngdar (also, Rengdar and Rengidar) is a village and the least populous municipality in the Quba Rayon of Azerbaijan.  It has a population of 116.

References 

Populated places in Quba District (Azerbaijan)